Apple O is the fifth studio album by the indie rock band Deerhoof. It was released in 2003 on Kill Rock Stars and 5 Rue Christine, an offshoot of Kill Rock Stars. The album is the group's first with guitarist Chris Cohen.

The 2013 LP version of the album contains a modified track listing.

Composition
The musical style of Apple O'  is seen as experimental noise pop. However, it has also been noted for having more in common with a "typical jangly" indie pop album. 

Bebop, dance, 1950s doo-wop, jangle pop, and jazz sounds all show up across the album as well.

Critical reception 

The record was released to positive assessments from music critics. Eric Carr for Pitchfork applauded it, calling it "a fascinating trip" and positively noted its "intense variety and sparklingly consistent pop songwriting". It received the website's "Best New Music" accolade.

Accolades

Year-end lists

Decade-end lists

Track listing

Personnel 
Deerhoof
Chris Cohen – guitar
John Dieterich – guitar
Satomi Matsuzaki – bass guitar and vocals
Greg Saunier – drums and vocals

References

Deerhoof albums
2003 albums
5 Rue Christine albums
Kill Rock Stars albums